CTC (Pronounced as STS, stands for , , Network of television stations) is a commercial television station based in Moscow, Russia. It belongs to the CTC Media company. The company is owned by National media group (Russia) and VTB Bank (Russia).

History
In 1994, Channel Six Petersburg (owned by then-current CTC Media StoryFirst Communications) began expanded outside St. Petersburg. Some local stations began rebroadcast that station: AMTV (Moscow), Zenit (Oryol), TSM Channel 10 (Novosibirisk, have been rebroadcast since the launch in 1991 but disaffiliated in 1995).

In December 1996, AMTV went into financial crisis, most of founders had left. It later joins StoryFirst Communications (at that time owned some regional TV in Russia). AMTV later joins those stations, leading to creating STS. STS was launched on 1 December 1996.

In 2002, Alexander Rodnyansky became General Director of the CTC. During the period of his leadership the ratings of the channel showed a quick and significant increase. 2006 - the best year in the history of STS. Then the average share of the channel's audience reached the highest level - 10.4% (audience "Russia, all viewers over four years").

December 21, 2009 - start broadcasting international version of the channel - "CTC International".

February 1, 2019 - CTC switched to a 16:9 broadcast format. November 2019 - the HD version of the TV channel started broadcasting.

Today STS broadcasts a mix between Russian productions and international programming of interest to its target audience, viewers aged 10–45, especially younger audiences.

Approximately 100 million people are within STS’s signal reach. In 2019, STS achieved an average audience share in its target demographic of 9.45%. It ranks as the sixth most watched nationwide broadcaster in Russia overall. STS network reaches approximately 96% of urban households.

Russian series

STS airs both licensed series and sitcom. Among original Russian series and sitcoms: Poor Nastya ("Бедная Настя"), Cadets ("Кадетство"), Daddy's Daughters ("Папины дочки"), Ranetki ("Ранетки", dramedy about the same musical group - Ranetki Girls), Kitchen ("Кухня"), Eighties ("Восьмидесятые"), The Junior Team ("Молодёжка"), Two Fathers, Two Sons ("Два отца и два сына"), Londongrad ("Лондонград"), Ivanov-Ivanov ("Ивановы-Ивановы"), 90's. Fun and loud ("90-е. Весело и громко").

In the 2010s, the number of licensed series decreased. The management of the channel relies on original Russian projects.

Foreign films
CTC Media maintains shows European and Hollywood films, including those from Disney (which also includes Pixar, Marvel, Lucasfilm, 20th Century Fox and Blue Sky Studios), Universal Pictures, Warner Bros., Paramount, Sony Pictures and others.

Russian films
STS Media participated in the shooting and promotion of many Russian films: The 9th Company ("9 рота"), Piter FM ("Питер FM"), Heat ("Жара"), Dark Planet ("Обитаемый остров"), Hooked on the Game ("На игре"), All Inclusive ("All inclusive, или Всё включено"), Have Fun, Vasya! ("Гуляй, Вася!"), Ice ("Лёд"), Yolki 7 ("Ёлки последние"), Invasion ("Вторжение") and others.

Russian shows
Among the most successful shows:
 comedy show - Good jokes ("Хорошие шутки"), Thank God You're Here ("Слава Богу, ты пришел!"), Ural dumplings ("Уральские пельмени")
 infotainment - Galileo ("Галилео"), Movies in details ("Кино в деталях"), Stories in Details ("Истории в деталях"), Infomania ("Инфомания")
 children's quiz show - The Cleverest ("Самый умный")
 style - What Not to Wear ("Снимите это немедленно"), Rogov. Studio 24 ("Рогов. Студия 24")

Animation
Cartoons from the collections of the Walt Disney Company, Universal Studios, Warner Bros. Discovery, Paramount Global, and others, make up an important part of CTC's daily programming. Every day a time slot from 03:00-09:00 (until 2012 - 14:00-16:00) is exclusively given to animated series such as Timon and Pumbaa, The Woody Woodpecker Show, TaleSpin, Tom and Jerry, Speed Racer, Aladdin, The Real Ghostbusters, Winx Club, Monster Allergy, Scooby-Doo, DuckTales, Chip 'n Dale Rescue Rangers, Darkwing Duck, Bonkers, and others.

Foreign series
In the 1990s and 2000s STS’s programming mix included a wide variety of popular foreign series such as Charles in Charge, Quantum Leap, Sliders, Kommissar Rex, Beverly Hills, 90210, Melrose Place, Charmed, Smallville, Heroes, The O.C., Grey’s Anatomy, Desperate Housewives, Nip/Tuck, Lizzie McGuire, Hannah Montana, Time Trax and Doctor Who. Series by Hollywood producers were an important part of STS’s brand. Those shows enjoyed outstanding audience appreciation.

See also
 How I Became Russian (series)

References

External links

 
STS Russia's channel on YouTube 

 
Alfa Group
Mass media companies of Russia
Television channels and stations established in 1996
1996 establishments in Russia
Russian-language television stations in Russia
Mass media in Moscow

sah:СТС